174th meridian may refer to:

174th meridian east, a line of longitude east of the Greenwich Meridian
174th meridian west, a line of longitude west of the Greenwich Meridian